"Shake Señora" ("Jump in the Line") is a song by American rapper and singer Pitbull from his sixth studio album Planet Pit (2011). The song features vocals from American R&B singer and rapper T-Pain and Jamaican reggae artist Sean Paul, and was produced by Clinton Sparks and DJ Snake. "Shake Senora" heavily samples "Jump in the Line (Shake, Senora)", composed in 1946 by Lord Kitchener and popularized in 1961 by Harry Belafonte. It was released as a digital single in July 2011 and subsequently peaked at number 69 on the Billboard Hot 100. A remix of the song featuring American rapper Ludacris was also released. The song was featured in the official trailer for Hotel Transylvania 3: Summer Vacation.

Track listing
 Album version
"Shake Senora" (featuring T-Pain and Sean Paul) (Original Version) – 3:34
"Shake Senora" (featuring T-Pain, Sean Paul and Ludacris) (Original Remix) – 4:12
"Shake Senora" (featuring T-Pain, Sean Paul, Eminem and Ludacris) (Triple Remix) - 5:13

Credits and personnel
Credits adapted from Planet Pit album liner notes.

 Harry Belafonte – songwriting ("Jump in the Line" sample)
 Ralph de Leon – songwriting
 William Grigahcine – songwriting
 Sean Paul Henriques – lead vocals, songwriting
 Faheem Najm – lead vocals, songwriting
 Gabriel Oller – songwriting
 Armando C. Perez – lead vocals, songwriting
 Steve Samuel – songwriting
 Clinton Sparks – production, songwriting
 Marshall Mathers - lead vocals

Charts

Certifications

References

2011 songs
2011 singles
Pitbull (rapper) songs
Songs written by Pitbull (rapper)
Songs written by Sean Paul
Songs written by T-Pain
Sean Paul songs
T-Pain songs
Ludacris songs
Songs written by Clinton Sparks
RCA Records singles
Songs written by DJ Snake